Greenwood Academy is a coeducational secondary school with academy status, located in Castle Vale, Birmingham, England.

The school opened in new premises in 1967. The buildings were completed and officially opened in 1969. It was built to serve the large new housing estate which was in the final stages of construction at this time. Later the school gained Performing Arts College specialist status.

The school converted to academy status in January 2013. The school is sponsored by the Academies Enterprise Trust (AET).The school faced much uncertainty when AET arranged a number of Head teachers. Then Mr Harry French was appointed Principal in June 2013 and immediately took action to solve the problems the school faced. Under his leadership the school has been subject to a turnaround, with many esteemed visitors expressing compliments, echoing Lord Nash's comment "..the school oozes aspiration". Mr French and the staff have re-established open events and have regained the confidence of the community. The school will start a new sixth form in September 2014 and the school is scheduled to be rebuilt, hopefully in 2017. In 2018, during the annual OFSTED report, the school was rated as good.

References

External links
 

Secondary schools in Birmingham, West Midlands
Academies in Birmingham, West Midlands
Academies Enterprise Trust